Matevž Lenarčič is an extreme light aircraft pilot from Slovenia. He is also an alpinist, paraglider, environmentalist, and a photographer. He has climbed all over the world and among others reached the top of 8051m Broad Peak in Himalaya and climbed extreme routes in Patagonia, like Fitz Roy. He is author of eleven books (nature, photography, climbing and flying), some of them awarded and translated in several languages. He is also founder and director of Aerovizija d.o.o.

Besides "normal" flying in Europe, mostly for aerial business purposes (vertical and oblique photography), he has also made some extreme flights:
Worldtrannsiberia 2002:
Around The Only World 2004:
Africa – Valley of Life 2005:
The Alps – A Bird's Eye View 2006–2009:  	28,000 km over 8 countries incl. Russia
38,000 km crossing 23 countries
17,000 km over 13 countries
60,000 km all over the Alps

He has flown for more than 3500 hours all over the world, mostly with his ultra light motor glider and other single engine aircraft. He holds PPL – private pilot license with IFR – (instrumental flight rules) rating, night qualification, and ULPL – ultralight pilot license.

Records
Official national speed record Around the World Eastbound
Unofficial world speed record Around the World Eastbound –
2nd place national competition RAL2 2005
Active member (Supervisory Board) AOPA Slovenija
Member AOPA America
Member EAA America (Experimental Aircraft Association)
Aero club Member AK Prlek and Društvo Zgornjesavinjskih letalcev
Aviator of the Year; Flightglobal Achievement Awards 2013

External links
http://www.wingsforever.com/
http://www.worldgreenflight.com/index.php?id=
http://www.aerovizija.com/
http://www.panalp.net/en/au_lenarcic.html
http://www.flightglobal.com/page/achievement-awards/2013/welcome/

1959 births
Living people
Slovenian aviators
Slovenian mountain climbers
Slovenian photographers
Slovenian environmentalists
Aviation record holders